The Mexica Movement is an "Indigenous rights educational organization" based in Los Angeles, California. Their organization views Mexicans of Native Mexican and Amerindian descent, as one people who are falsely divided by European-imposed borders. Their ultimate objective is the non-violent, democratic "liberation" of the Western Hemisphere from European-descendants. The organization seeks to create a future nation called Cemanahuac. The group views "White" people as Europeans who are squatting on indigenous lands, and who must be repatriated back to Europe.  The group rejects the "Aztlán ideology" as being too limited, seeking instead to unite the entire American continents under indigenous control.

Name and origin
The name Mexica is derived from the Nahuatl word Mēxihcah, the name the Aztecs used for themselves.

The organization is named after the Mexica (a.k.a. Aztec) civilization. This civilization is seen as the best chance from which the continent's indigenous-descent peoples can reconstruct themselves as a nation, similar to the way that modern Italians unified their nation under Roman-Italic identity and the Tuscan dialect.

Nican Tlaca (literally meaning "Man Here") was first used in an ethnic context in the book We People Here by John Lockhart (who was the first person to create Nican Tlaca as an identity). Nican Tlaca is grammatically incorrect. Contemporary native Nahuatl speakers are dumbfounded by it since it is incomplete. In ancient text, it was used as a pronoun, not as an ethnic group as the Mexica Movement claim.

Flag symbolism

The Mexica Movement's flag features indigenous Mesoamerican and new age spirituality symbolism. The black-and-white design in the center is a symbol used in New Age Mayanism which depicts duality (life and death, male and female, matter and non-matter, seen and unseen, etc.) This design is referred to as Hunab Ku in Mayanism which was borrowed from the Yucatec Maya word for "The Only God", which refers to the Christian God. The Mexica Movement is also referred to as Ometeotl in the Nahuatl language though there is evidence that Miguel Portilla created that term. The two dualities complement one another and are unified in balance. The four colors and four elements are from the Greek's Classical Element; Red represent fire, Black for Earth, White for Air and Blue for water

Issues

Historical awareness
Mexica Movement is a non-violent, educational organization. It focuses on teaching the public about the pre-European civilizations of Nican Tlaca (indigenous people). In addition, the group promotes the study of incidents of alleged "European genocidal crimes against [Indigenous People]". The group advocates this historical awareness in order to reframe the context of discussions about indigenous people and the current governments they live under.
In 2015, the movement protested the canonization of Junípero Serra due to his alleged genocide of native people.

Identity
The organization is not part of MeCha, National Council of La Raza, Brown Berets, "Aztlanistas" or other "Latino/Hispanic" organizations; nor do they support the Latino/Hispanic agenda which they view as pro-colonial and anti-Nican Tlaca (anti-Indigenous).  They are also not part of the Spain-centric "Aztlan" ("Southwest" liberation) agenda because it does not align to their view of total liberation of the Cemanahuac continent ("North and South America").

The organization considers the vast majority of Mexicans and Central Americans to be indigenous people of the Western Hemisphere. The group rejects all labels that originate from European-descent people. This would include Latino, Hispanic, Chicano, Indian, and mestizo. Such labels are considered to be "European-colonial" imposed. The group includes mixed-bloods, full-bloods, and individuals who self-identify as being indigenous.

Language
The organization uses the spoken and written European languages English and Spanish to communicate in daily life, but rejects the inclusion of European languages into their identity and vision for a future indigenous nation. All European languages are seen as foreign and instruments of European colonialism, even as most of the members of this organization are unable to speak or read in any of the native languages they represent due to settler colonialism, including forced erasure of indigenous languages.

Land ownership

The Mexica Movement believes that the entire continent of North America, which they refer to as "Anahuac", belongs collectively to the indigenous people of the Americas: Latin Americans of Amerindian descent, Native Americans, and Canadian First Nations. The entire Western Hemisphere is referred to as Cemanahuac ("The whole World Between The Waters" in the Nahuatl language).

Genocide
"Genocide def. Raphael Lemkin defines Genocide as, '...the planned annihilation [killing] of a national [Mexican/’Central American’] or racial group [indigenous] by a variety of actions [biological warfare, oppression, enslavement, denial of Indigenous identity] aimed at undermining the foundations essential [our Pre-European Anahuac history and the wealth of our land] to the survival of the group as a group.'"

The movement claims "Europeans intentionally used biological weapons of mass destruction to clear the way for European settlers."  Based primarily on the books of American historian and professor of American studies at the University of Hawaii David Stannard, American Holocaust, Ward Churchill, "A little matter of Genocide", James Blaut, "The colonizer's Model of the world", "Eight Eurocentric Historians", and Charles C. Mann, along with circumstantial evidence, and by their own admission they documented themselves.  Beginning in the Canary Islands, then in the Caribbean in 1492, and finally in the mainland in 1519.  Europeans and their descendants committed a genocide that killed 95% of the indigenous peoples in the Americas. This allowed Europe and peoples of European descent to prosper materially and to develop themselves at the expense of indigenous peoples labor, land, and wealth.

Borders
All current accepted borders across the Western Hemisphere are regarded in the opinion of the Mexica Movement as "colonial" and are rejected by the group. The only true border for Europeans, the group feels, is the Atlantic Ocean seaboard. The group maintains that indigenous people have the right to move freely among their own people of the continent disregarding all laws and national borders with whom they believe they may share bloodlines and culture.

Liberation
In response to an article published by the Associated Press, the Mexica Movement states that it has a strict non-violence policy. The group is committed to a long-term liberation-by-education methodology which seeks to "change hearts and minds" by educating people of the civilized achievements of indigenous people before 1492, and of the alleged genocide and land/resource appropriations by Europeans since that date. The group supports the preservation of the U.S. Constitution and the Bill of Rights as a legal framework to protect both indigenous and European peoples' rights during the multi-generational process of liberation. The movement does not consider any form of migration by indigenous peoples, as illegal since they consider it to be their land.

Repatriation of white population back to Europe
The Mexica Movement wishes to have white supremacists returned to Europe. The next phase that the group wishes for should be a negotiation to repatriate the majority white population back into Europe; this is to be accomplished over the course of a few generations. Also to be addressed will be discussions of how the Mexica Movement demands Europe and European-descent people collectively deliver reparations to the peoples of the Western Hemisphere.

On its website, the movement states that "Europeans have a homeland: EUROPE. We are only asking unwelcomed guests to leave our home.  These Europeans have a home to go to. The non-racists can be part of a transition to our full independence, it's not as if Europeans are being asked to go into the Atlantic Ocean. They have a beautiful home called Europe."

See also
Manifest Destiny

Further reading

 Arturo Chang. 2021. "Restoring Anáhuac: Indigenous Genealogies and Hemispheric Republicanism in Postcolonial Mexico." American Journal of Political Science.

References

External links

Olin Tezcatlipoca blog

Indigenous nationalism in the Americas
Native American nationalism
Mexican irredentism
Mexican-American culture in California
Mexican-American organizations
Organizations based in Los Angeles